Tlaxcala has the fewest radio stations of any Mexican state.

List of stations

References

Tlaxcala